The Saviem Super Galion is a truck under 6 tonnes gross vehicle weight (GVW) produced by the French manufacturer Saviem between 1965 and 1982. It was also marketed as the Renault Super Galion.

History

In 1957, Saviem introduced the Galion, a small commercial vehicle based on previous Renault models with a 2.5-tonne payload and related to the smaller Goélette. In 1965, as part of a renovation of the company's small vehicle range, the Saviem Super Galion was introduced along with the lighter Super Goélette. The new truck had a 5.950-tonne GVW, right under the limit after which the acquisition would have been required special permits in France. At the 1968 Paris Show was unveiled a new version of the Super Galion called the SG5, with changes to the suspension and gearbox.  The design was revised in 1968, 1969 and 1979, in-line with the Super Goélette revisions. From 21 April 1980 onwards, the truck was sold under the RVI badge.

International
Through a partnership agreement, the Super Galion was assembled by the Czech manufacturer Avia and marketed as the Avia A30. It was also assembled under licence by Alfa Romeo, which sold it as the Alfa Romeos A38 and F20. MAN marketed the model badging it as 475 and 7-90.

Technical details

Engines
The 591-01 was followed in 1968 by the similar 599–01, which simply changed the Ricardo's fuel injection for a direct fuel injection sourced by MAN. It was replaced shortly after by the 712–01.

Dimensions and variants
By 1970, the Super Galion was offered for sale with three options: bare metal chassis (for coachbuilding), cabin with only lateral panels (also for coachbuilding) and with complete bodywork.

Suspension, transmission and related systems
The truck has an independent front suspension with coil springs and wishbones. At the rear it mounts a beam axle with leaf springs instead of the coil springs used by the similarly designed Super Goélette. It has telescopic dampers on both axles. The transmission is a rear-wheel drive system with a fully synchronised 4-speed gearbox. The drivetain has a double universal joint on the normal chassis and a triple universal joint with relay shaft on the long and extra long. Brakes are drums on both axles. The steering system is a gammer worm and roller.

References
 The entry incorporates text translated from the corresponding French Wikipedia entry as of 30 July 2016.

Saviem
Vehicles introduced in 1965